Linnaeite is a cobalt sulfide mineral with the composition  Co+2Co+32S4. It was discovered in 1845 in Västmanland, Sweden, and was named to honor Carl Linnaeus (1707–1778).

Linnaeite forms a series with polydymite, Ni+2Ni+32S4.  Linnaeite is found in hydrothermal veins with other cobalt and nickel sulfides in many localities around the world.

References

 

Cobalt minerals
Thiospinel group
Cubic minerals
Minerals in space group 227
Commemoration of Carl Linnaeus